Neil Oliver (born 11 April 1967) is an English former footballer who played for Berwick Rangers, Blackburn Rovers, Falkirk, Hamilton Academical, Clydebank and East Fife.

Following a spell as a coach of the Berwick Rangers reserve team, Oliver became manager of Duns in 2009, taking them from the Border Amateur League into the East of Scotland League in 2011–12. He parted company with Duns in August 2013, and was appointed manager of East of Scotland League Premier Division side Coldstream on 21 January 2014. On 15 October 2014, Neil resigned as manager of Coldstream.

Honours
Falkirk
Scottish Challenge Cup: 1993–94

References

External links

1967 births
Living people
People from Berwick-upon-Tweed
English footballers
Association football defenders
Berwick Rangers F.C. players
Blackburn Rovers F.C. players
Falkirk F.C. players
Hamilton Academical F.C. players
Clydebank F.C. (1965) players
East Fife F.C. players
Scottish Football League players
English Football League players
English football managers
Coldstream F.C. players
Linlithgow Rose F.C. players
Footballers from Northumberland